Two submarines of the United States Navy have been named Aspro after the aspro, a fish found abundantly in the upper Rhone River.

 , a Balao-class submarine, served during World War II.
 , a Sturgeon-class submarine, served during the Cold War.

Sources

United States Navy ship names